The Play-offs of the 2006 Fed Cup Americas Zone Group I were the final stages of the Group I Zonal Competition involving teams from the Americas. Using the positions determined in their pools, the eight teams faced off to determine their placing in the 2006 Fed Cup Americas Zone Group I, the top countries of each pool played for first to second, while the bottom two of each pool competed for fifth to eighth. The team that ended up placing first overall advanced to World Group II play-offs, whilst those coming in seventh were relegated down to Group II for the next year.

Promotion play-offs
The first placed teams of each pool were placed against each other in two head-to-head rounds. The winner of the rounds advanced to the World Group II play-offs, where they would get a chance to advance to the World Group II for next year.

Canada vs. Brazil

Third to Fourth play-off
The second placed teams of each pool were placed against each other in a tie. The winner of the tie was allocated third place in the Group while the loser was allocated fourth.

Mexico vs. Puerto Rico

Relegation play-offs
The last and second-to-last placed teams of each pool were placed against each other in two head-to-head rounds. The losing team of the rounds were relegated to Group II for next year.

Chile vs. Cuba

Uruguay vs. Colombia

Final Placements

  advanced to the World Group II Play-offs, and were drawn against , where they won 3–2. The team thus advanced to World Group II for the next year.
The Uruguayans placed equal first, and thus advanced back to Group I for 2008, while the Cubans did not compete.

See also
Fed Cup structure

References

External links
 Fed Cup website

2006 Fed Cup Americas Zone